Rañeces is one of 28 parishes (administrative divisions) in the municipality of Grado, within the province and autonomous community of Asturias, in northern Spain. 

The population is 122 (INE 2007).

Villages and hamlets include: La Figal, Los Llanos de Rañeces, Pando, Panizal, Rañeces and Temia.

References

Parishes in Grado